Kalle Tuppurainen (28 November 1904 – 1 January 1954) was a Finnish skier.

He was member of the Finnish Militäry patrol team (demonstration event) at the 1928 Winter Olympics which placed second.

At the Nordic World Ski Championships 1938 he finished 51st at the cross-country skiing competition.

Cross-country skiing results

World Championships

References 

1904 births
1954 deaths
Finnish military patrol (sport) runners
Finnish male cross-country skiers
Olympic biathletes of Finland
Military patrol competitors at the 1928 Winter Olympics
20th-century Finnish people